The North American Reformed Seminary (also referred to as TNARS) is a private online, non-profit, distance educational, Christian, reformed seminary whose mission states is "to educate the body of Christ completely free of charge."  Spreading the Gospel and strengthening the church through this school is the goal of this seminary. As their goal is education rather than qualification, TNARS is not accredited.

TNARS offers seven degrees, they are earned and awarded through the completion of the required curriculum. The North American Reformed Seminary is not affiliated with a particular Christian denomination but it does adhere to the Westminster Confession of Faith. The seminary wishes to follow the same doctrine as the Reformers did during the period of the Protestant Reformation.

Students who attend TNARS come from many reformed and non-reformed Christian backgrounds. The seminary confirms the five solas within its foundation, and those are 1. Sola Fide (by faith alone), 2. Sola Scriptura (by Scripture alone), 3. Solus Christus (through Christ alone), 4. Sola Gratia (by grace alone), and 5. Soli Deo Gloria (glory to God alone).

Academics
TNARS offers a variety of seven degrees varying from an Associate degree to a Doctorate degree.  Here is a list of degrees the seminary awards.
1. Associate of Theological Studies (ATS)
2. Bachelor of Theological Studies (BTS)
3. Bachelor of Divinity (B.Div.)
4. Master of Theological Studies (MTS)
5. Master of Divinity (M.Div.)
6. Doctor of Ministry (D.Min.)
7. Doctor of Theology (Th.D), in Puritan Studies
According to the admissions, certain qualifications are required for each field of study.

Accreditation
The North American Reformed Seminary is an unaccredited theological institution that is officially exempt from the state regulation of South Carolina. This is because of its religious training and programs according to the South Carolina Code of Laws, Nonpublic Postsecondary Institution License Act, Section 59-58-30(4).  They do not wish to seek accreditation but instead wish to accumulate their reputation by the biblical principal "by their fruits you shall know them", and also by the reputation of their graduates.

Even though TNARS is not accredited, the seminary is an affiliate of the Association of Reformed Theological Seminaries (ARTS) and is recognized by the Evangelical Reformed Council on Academics (ERCA).

See also
Protestant Reformation
Christianity
Reformed Christianity
List of Calvinist educational institutions in North America
List of unaccredited institutions of higher education

References

External links
 

Seminaries and theological colleges in South Carolina
Unaccredited Christian universities and colleges in the United States
Education in Sumter County, South Carolina